Terthrothrips is a genus of thrips in the family Phlaeothripidae.

Species
 Terthrothrips ananthakrishnani
 Terthrothrips apterus
 Terthrothrips balteatus
 Terthrothrips bicinctus
 Terthrothrips bruesi
 Terthrothrips brunneus
 Terthrothrips bucculentus
 Terthrothrips bullifer
 Terthrothrips carens
 Terthrothrips fuscatus
 Terthrothrips gracilicornis
 Terthrothrips hebes
 Terthrothrips impolitus
 Terthrothrips irretitus
 Terthrothrips levigatus
 Terthrothrips luteolus
 Terthrothrips magnicauda
 Terthrothrips marginatus
 Terthrothrips palmatus
 Terthrothrips parvus
 Terthrothrips peltatus
 Terthrothrips percultus
 Terthrothrips sanguinolentus
 Terthrothrips serratus
 Terthrothrips sordidus
 Terthrothrips strasseni
 Terthrothrips trigonius
 Terthrothrips unicinctus
 Terthrothrips viduus

References

Phlaeothripidae
Thrips
Thrips genera